The 2013 Vancouver Whitecaps FC season was the Whitecaps' third season in Major League Soccer, the top tier of soccer in the United States and Canada.

Season overview

January

January 11, 2013 Vancouver Whitecaps FC announced the signing of Brad Rusin. He was sold to the Whitecaps for an undisclosed fee.

The 2013 MLS SuperDraft was the fourteenth SuperDraft presented by Major League Soccer. The draft took place on January 17, 2013 in Indianapolis, at the Indiana Convention Center.
Vancouver Whitecaps FC drafted Kekuta Manneh with the No. 4 pick and Erik Hurtado with the No. 5 pick in the MLS Super Draft.

January 21, 2013 the Vancouver Whitecaps FC and Barry Robson mutually agreed to terminate his Whitecaps contract. Robson later signed with Sheffield United.

January 23, 2013 Vancouver Whitecaps FC announce the signings of Corey Hertzog and Tom Heinemann to contracts.

January 25, 2013 Vancouver Whitecaps FC announced Martín Bonjour contract had been waived. Bonjour was a starter until the signing of defender Andy O'Brien

January 28, 2013 Whitecaps announced the signing of Japanese midfielder Daigo Kobayashi. He played last season with Shimizu S-Pulse of the J1 League.

February

The Caps went to Arizona to play three preseason games between January 29 and February 4, 2013. The first game against New England Revolution saw the Caps play to an easy 4–1 win. Darren Mattocks scored a hat trick with goals in the 2nd, 5th and 15th minutes. Kenny Miller scored in the 65th minute on a penalty kick to secure the win. The next game say the Caps improve to 2–0 in the preseason with a 2–1 win over the Houston Dynamo. Caps got goals from Mattocks (fourth goal in two games) and Hertzog's first of the preseason. Vancouver Whitecaps FC finished their Arizona training by improving to 3–0 in preseason with a 2–1 victory over the Arizona Sahuaros. New signing Paulo Jr scored the only goal of the game. Simon Thomas saw his first action with the Whitecaps since the 2010 season.

February 15, 2013 says the Whitecaps travel to Charleston, South Carolina to participate in the Carolina Challenge Cup. The first game saw the Whitecaps squeak out a 3–2 win over the Charleston Battery. Whitecaps got a brace from rookie Kekuta Manneh. Caps third goal was a goal of the year candidate by Daigo Kobayashi on a nice cross by Y.P. Lee.

February 17, 2013 the Vancouver Whitecaps FC played a friendly against College of Charleston. With a young looking lineup the Caps managed a 2–0 win. Improving their preseason record to 5–0. Paulo Jr managed the brace for the only two goals of the games. Veteran goalkeeper Joe Cannon managed the clean sheet and didn't see his first shot until the 88th minute.

February 19, 2013 Vancouver Whitecaps FC announced the signing of Honduran defender/midfielder Johnny Leverón. The club also announced they will play a friendly against the UVIC Vikings on March 16, 2013 at 1pm at Centennial Stadium. The Caps and Vikes have played every year since 2005 when the Blue and White were a North American second division club, including last year's 2–1 win for Whitecaps FC in the first-ever meeting between an MLS club and a Canadian Interuniversity Sport (CIS) side. Vancouver holds the edge in record with five wins, one defeat, and one draw.

February 20, 2013 A first-half goal from Corey Hertzog gave Vancouver Whitecaps FC the lead, but a pair of second-half goals in quick succession from Houston Dynamo saw the 'Caps fall to their first defeat of preseason. The loss drops the Caps preseason record to 5–1.

Nigel Reo-Coker accepted an offer from the Whitecaps on February 21, 2013. His discovery rights had been held by Portland, but Reo-Coker expressed a desire to play for the Vancouver club instead having been impressed with the professionalism of Vancouver head coach Martin Rennie.

Vancouver Whitecaps FC and Chicago Fire played to a 1–1 draw on February 23, 2013 in the final game for both teams at the Carolina Challenge Cup. The draw gave the Chicago Fire the win for the tournament. Mattocks scored his fifth of the pre-season on a penalty kick in the 68th minute. Miller was tackled in the box to get the Whitecaps the penalty kick opportunity. The Caps finished the Carolina Cup with a 1–1–1 record.

The Whitecaps defeated the Carolina Railhawks 3–0 on February 24, 2013 to win the Carolina Community Shield. They were led by Camilo's hat trick to put the Railhawks to rest. This match was the final preseason match.

The 'Caps announced the signing of goalkeeper Simon Thomas to a contract on February 25, 2013. This is his second stint with the team. The following day it was announced that Gershon Koffie signed a contract extension and obtained a Canadian residency card which frees an international roster slot.

March

The Vancouver Whitecaps opened the season with a 1–0 victory over Canadian rival TFC. Koffie scored the only goal of the game in the 59'. Joe Cannon earned the clean sheet.

On March 9, 2013 the Caps defeated the Columbus Crew 2–1 for a second straight victory to start the season. Daigo Kobayashi opened the scoring in the 6' with a 35-yard strike. Columbus scored in the 46' to tie the game 1–1. Kenny Miller created his own chance on a Crew turnover in the 57' to seal the victory.

A first-half goal from Darren Mattocks was not enough on March 23, 2013 as Vancouver Whitecaps fell to a 2–1 defeat against Houston Dynamo at BBVA Compass Stadium. The club lost their second consecutive match on the road with a 2–1 defeat to Chivas USA. Kenny Miller scored his team-leading second goal of the year in the 64th minute.

Whitecaps finished March with a 2W 2L record.

April

April 6, 2013 The Vancouver Whitecaps and SJ Earthquake played to a 1–1 draw. Corey Hertzog scored his first MLS goal to give the Whitecaps a hard earned draw.

April 13, 2013 The Vancouver Whitecaps and Real Salt Lake played to a 1–1 draw. It was the Caps second straight draw with a 1–1 result. Camilo scored on a PK in the 84' min to get the Whitecaps the result.

April 14, 2013 The Whitecaps reserves kicked off their regular season with a 2–0 result against the RSL reserves side. Koffie was caution with a yellow in the 25' minute. Harvey got the Whitecaps on the board with a goal in the 44' minute just before half. Hurtado sealed the victory with a goal in the 85' minute to give the Whitecaps a 2–0 win. Knighton earned the clean sheet in his first minutes of the season.

April 16, 2013 The Whitecaps announced Ben Fisk and Emmanuel Adjetey have joined USL Pro side Charleston Battery on season-long loans.

April 17, 2013 The Whitecaps announced they waived Paulo Jr. He joined the Whitecaps after being selected by Vancouver with the 10th pick in Stage 2 of the 2012 MLS Re-Entry Draft on December 14, 2012

April 20, 2013 The Whitecaps suffered their 3rd road defeat to start the season with a 2–0 loss against FC Dallas. Matt Watson and Tommy Heinemann make their first starts for Vancouver this season.

April 24, 2013 In the first leg of the Amway Canadian Championship semifinal, the Whitecaps needed a late winner by substitute Heinemann to come from behind and defeat FC Edmonton by a score of 3–2 at Commonwealth Stadium. Camilo scored a brace with a strike in the 5' minute and a penalty kick in the 83' minute. The return leg is at BC Place May 1, 2013.

April 27, 2013 Whitecaps and FC Dallas played to a 2–2 draw. The Caps tied it up with goals by Camilo and Kekuta Manneh to earn the draw.

April 30, 2013 Whitecaps announced Bryce Alderson has joined Charleston Battery for the season on loan.

Whitecaps finished April with a 1W 1L 3D record

May

May 1, 2013 The Whitecaps punched their ticket to the Amway final with a 2–0 win over FC Edmonton. The Whitecaps won their semi final with a 5–2 aggregate score. Hertzog scored a scorcher from 25 yards out after coming in as a second-half sub. Teibert had his corner put in by Shaun Saiko for a FC Edmonton own goal. The win gives the Whitecaps a date with the Montreal Impact after they defeated Toronto FC 6–2 in the other semifinal. The Impact will host the first leg at Saputo Stadium on May 15 before the Whitecaps host the second leg at BC Place on May 29.

May 2, 2013 Whitecaps FC announced that Ghanaian midfielder Aminu Abdallah. Abdallah, 19, joins Whitecaps FC following five years with Ghanaian club International Allies FC. The native of Accra, Ghana, is a member of Ghana's U-20 side and played with fellow 'Caps midfielder Gershon Koffie from 2008 to 2010 with International Allies FC.

May 4, 2013 The Whitecaps fell 2–0 to Real Salt Lake. They are still trying to earn their first win on the road for the 2013 season. Nigel Reo-Coker picked up his 4th yellow of the season. One more and he is suspended for a game.

May 7, 2013 Whitecaps FC reserves improved to 2–0 with a win over Colorado Rapids Reserves. Manneh scored in the 12' minute to open the scoring to give the Whitecaps a 1–0 lead. Rapids tied the score in the 41' minute to go into half tied 1–1. In the 74' minute Heinemann scored the game winner to get the Whitecaps reserves a 2–1 win.

May 10, 2013 Whitecaps U23 opened the USL PDL season with a 2–1 victory over the Kitsap Pumas. It was a chippy game with 5 yellow cards handed out. After the Pumas opened the scoring in the 6' minute then Caps came back in the second-half with goals by Cam Hundal and Spencer DeBoice. Simon Thomas earned the victory with a solid game.

May 11, 2013 The Whitecaps defeated LA Galaxy 3–1 to earn their first MLS victory since March 9 vs. Columbus Crew. The Caps got a brace by Teibert and Mattocks scored in injury time to seal the victory.

May 15, 2013 The Vancouver Whitecaps played to a 0–0 draw with the Montreal Impact in leg one of the Amway Championship. This sets up the final leg to be played May 29 at BC Place at 7pm. The Whitecaps will be hoping to earn their first Voyageurs Cup in club history.

May 17, 2013 Whitecaps U23 lost a 3–2 heartbreaker to the Victoria Highlanders in PDL play. The loss dropped the Whitecaps to a record of 1–1. The Whitecaps got a brace by Niall Cousens but it wasn't enough to earn a draw. The win gives the Highlanders the lead in the Juan de Fuca Plate competition.

May 18, 2013 The Whitecaps started their quest for a Cascadia championship with a 2–2 draw against the Portland Timbers. A first half free kick goal by Camilo put the Whitecaps up 1–0 at half. Koffie put the Whitecaps up 2–1 in the 54' minute. Reo-Coker picked up his fifth yellow of the season and will be suspended for the June 1 match vs New York Red Bulls.

May 19, 2013 Whitecaps FC reserves improved their record to 2–1–0 with a 1–1 draw with the Portland Timbers reserves. Heinemann scored the Whitecaps lone goal in the 26' minute. Simon Thomas earned the draw.

May 23, 2013 Whitecaps U23 dropped a 2–0 defeat to the Portland Timbers PDL team. The loss drops their record to 1 win and 2 losses.

May 26, 2013 Whitecaps U23 improved their record to 2–2 with a 5–1 defeat of the North Sound SeaWolves FC. Harry Lakhan and Spencer DeBoice each scored a brace, with Niall Cousens capping off the 5 goal outbreak.

May 29, 2013 Whitecaps played to a 2–2 draw with the Montreal Impact in the final of the Amway Championship. The draw gave the Impact the trophy and gave the Whitecaps second place for the fifth straight year. Whitecaps got goals from Camilo and Kobayashi.

May 31, 2013 Whitecaps U23 improved their record to 3–2 with a 5–3 defeat of the Victoria Highlanders. The victory gives the Whitecaps the lead for the Juan de Fuca Plate with the lead with away goals (5). The deciding game is June 28, 2013 at 7pm at UBC Thunderbird Stadium.

Whitecaps finished May with a 2–1–3 record in all competitions

June

June 1, 2013 The Whitecaps earned their first victory on the road of the 2013 season with a come from behind 2–1 victory over the New York Red Bulls. The Whitecaps got goals from Jordan Harvey and Kenny Miller. Brad Knighton earned the victory in goal.

June 2, 2013 Whitecaps U23 dropped their record to 3W 3L 0D with a 1–0 defeat at the hands of Seattle Sounders U23.

June 5, 2013 The Whitecaps Reserves squandered a 3–0 lead at half against Chivas USA Reserves. Chivas came back with three goals in the second half to earn a point with a 3–3 draw. Manneh opened the scoring with a strike in the 6' min. The Whitecaps got a brace from striker Heinemann with goals in the 33' and 45' mins. Joe Cannon was in goal for the first half, Simon Thomas replaced him. Reserves next game is June 22 with an exhibition game against the Richmond Kickers.

June 6, 2013 Whitecaps FC trades Alain Rochat to D.C. United for a natural second-round pick in the 2015 MLS SuperDraft, as well as a conditional pick in 2016.

June 7, 2013 Whitecaps U23 defeated North Sound SeaWolves FC by a score of 3–2. The win gives the U23 a record of 4W 3L 0D. Whitecaps got goals by Cam Hundal, Harry Lakhan and the winner in injury time by Michael Winter to seal the victory.

June 8, 2013 Whitecaps U23 played to a hard-fought 2–2 with the Kitsap Pumas. It was their second game in two nights. Harry Lakhan scored his second goal in two nights. Niall Cousens scored in the 71st min to get the U23's a draw. Their record is 4W 3L 1D.

The Whitecaps lost a 3–2 heart-breaker to the Seattle Sounders FC. The Sounders opened the scoring in the ninth minute to go up 1–0. Camilo tied the game up 1 minute later with a header of a Teibert cross. Camilo put the Whitecaps up 2–1 with another header off a free kick by Teibert. Things were looking good until Andy O'Brien went down with a hamstring injury in the 62nd minute. Sounders tied it in the 70th minute with a penalty kick after Greg Klazura got called for a penalty in the box. The Sounders went up for good with a goal in the 81st minute to seal the victory.

June 12, 2013 Whitecaps U23 fell 2–0 to the Washington Crossfire. The loss drops their record to 4W 4L 1D.

June 15, 2013 The Whitecaps pulled out a thrilling 4–3 victory over the New England Revolution. They got a brace from Miller, and goals from Camilo and Jordan Harvey. After going down 2–0 in the first 20 minutes, Miller earned the Whitecaps a penalty kick well being taken down in the box. The Revolution were down to 10 men after a red card was issued on the penalty. In the 68' minute Miller scored the Whitecaps goal of the year with a floater over two defenders and the keeper from 20 yards out.

June 19, 2013 The Whitecaps pulled out a second straight come from behind victory with a 3–1 win over Chivas USA. After going down 1–0 early the Whitecaps got two goals in the first half in injury time from Harvey and then from Camilo. The two goals gave the Whitecaps the lead at half. Camilo put the game away with his second goal of the game in the 81st minute.

June 20, 2013 The Whitecaps announced the signing of Danish goalkeeper David Ousted who most recently played for Randers of the Danish Superliga.

June 21, 2013 Whitecaps U23 pulled out a 4–2 victory over the Seattle Sounders U23's. They got three goals and one assist from Bobby Jhutty. The win gives them a record of 5W 4L 1D.

June 22, 2013 The Whitecaps Reserves earned a 1–1 versus the Richmond Kickers. Whitecaps got the goal from Kekuta Manneh.

June 28, 2013  The Whitecaps U23 battled to a 1–1 draw against Victoria Highlanders FC despite being reduced to 10 men. The point was enough for Vancouver to claim the Juan de Fuca Plate for the second season in a row.

June 29, 2013 The Whitecaps pulled out a 1–0 victory over D.C. United. Whitecaps got their lone strike from Camilo. Knighton earned their first clean sheet since game one of the MLS season.

Whitecaps finished June with a 4W 1L record in all competitions.

July

July 3, 2013 The Whitecaps earned a hard-fought 1–1 draw against Sporting KC. Camilo scored his tenth MLS goal and thirteenth goal over all this season.

July 6, 2013 The Whitecaps won their first Cascada match in 12 games with a 2–0 victory over the Seattle Sounders FC. Knighton earned his second clean sheet in three games with a handful of amazing saves. Whitecaps got goals from Miller and Mattocks.

July 7, 2013 The Whitecaps reserves dominated the Seattle Sounder reserves 4–0 in David Ousted 1st performance in a Whitecaps jersey. Playing a very young line up the Whitecaps got goals from Hurtado, Sam Adekugbe and a brace from Heinemann his 5th and 6th reserve goals of the season.

July 14, 2013 The Whitecaps defeated the Chicago Fire 3–1 to remain undefeated at BC Place. The Whitecaps got two second-half goals from Camilo, his 11th and league-leading 12th of the season. Kekuta Manneh put the game away with his second goal of the season. Chicago scored late in second-half stoppage time to rob Knighton of his clean sheet. The keeper stormed off the field when play resumed and the final whistle blew but later made a public apology to his teammates and the fans.

The Whitecaps U23 secured a playoff position with a 1–0 victory over the Washington Crossfire.

July 16, 2013 The Whitecaps reserves were defeated for the first time falling 3–2 in heartbreaking fashion to Real Salt Lake reserves. The Caps got goals from Kevin Cobby and Kekuta Manneh.

July 17, 2013 The Whitecaps U23 finished off the PDL season with a 4–1 win over North Sound SeaWolves FC. The Caps got a brace from Cam Hundal and goals from Niall Cousens and Sasa Plavsic.

July 20, 2013 The Whitecaps FC fell 2–1 to the LA Galaxy. Camilo got his 13th MLS goal of the season and 16th overall.

July 23, 2013 The Whitecaps Reserves fell 2–1 to the Richmond Kickers. Manneh scored in the 90th minute.

The Whitecaps U23 suffered a heartbreaking 5–4 loss on penalty kicks to the Portland Timbers. The loss ends the U23 PDL season for the young team.

July 27, 2013 The Whitecaps FC fell 1–0 to the Philadelphia Union for their 1st loss at home this season

Whitecaps finished July with a 2W 2L 1D record in all competitions

August

August 3, 2013 The Whitecaps earned a 1–1 draw against the Portland Timbers in David Ousted's MLS debut. The Whitecaps got a Jordan Harvey goal to earn the draw. The single point continued to give the Whitecaps the lead for the Cascadia Cup. The following day, the Whitecaps reserves beat the Portland Timbers reserves 3–2 to move into first place in the reserves West division table. The Whitecaps got a brace from Tommy Heinemann and a goal from Erik Hurtado to earn the victory.

August 8, 2013 the Whitecaps loaned striker Corey Hertzog to FC Edmonton.

The Whitecaps announced a contract extension for central back Andy O'Brien until the end of the 2014 season.

August 10, 2013 David Ousted earned his first career MLS clean sheet in his home debut at BC Place with a 2–0 win over the San Jose Earthquakes. The Whitecaps got goals from Camilo and Kenny Miller. Both goals were set up by Nigel Reo-Coker.

August 17, 2013 the Whitecaps fell 2–0 to the Colorado Rapids. This was Ousted's first MLS loss.

August 24, 2013 the Whitecaps lost 1–0 to the LA Galaxy. The Galaxy got the only goal of the game from Landon Donovan in the 3rd minute. With a yellow card in the 91st minute Nigel Reo-Coker will be suspended for the September 1 game against Chivas USA. The loss drop Ousted's MLS record to 1 win 2 losses 1 draw 1.00GAA.

Whitecaps finished August with a 1W 2L 1D record in all competitions

September

Players

Current roster

Technical staff

Management

Squad information

Transfers in

Transfers out

source:

Draft picks

Loan out

Preseason competitions

Arizona training

South Carolina training

Carolina Challenge Cup

Carolina Derby

Preseason player statistics

Updated as of February 24, 2013
Field players

Updated as of February 24, 2013
Goalkeepers

2013 season overall

Squad stats

Major League Soccer

Western Conference standings

Overall table 

Note: the table below has no impact on playoff qualification and is used solely for determining host of the MLS Cup, certain CCL spots, and 2014 MLS draft. The conference tables are the sole determinant for teams qualifying to the playoffs

Results summary

Results

Canadian Championship

The club participated in the four-team Canadian Championship which includes FC Edmonton, Montreal Impact and Toronto FC. The champion of the tournament was awarded the Voyageurs Cup and qualified for the 2013–14 CONCACAF Champions League group stage. Vancouver lost in the finals to Montreal on the away goals rule.

Semi-finals

Finals

Cascadia Cup 

The Whitecaps have had a long-standing rivalry with the Pacific Northwest clubs Seattle Sounders FC and Portland Timbers, dating back to the 1970s when ancestry clubs of the same name played in the original and now-defunct North American Soccer League. The tri-member tournament will continue in 2013.

The winner is determined through league matches between the sides, and the club with the best record against both sides wins the trophy. The 2013 MLS season will see an unbalanced schedule due to an uneven number of teams with the addition of the Montreal Impact. As a result, the Whitecaps will play three matches each against Portland and Seattle. The odd number of matches means Vancouver will host the Timbers twice and Sounders once while visiting Seattle twice Portland once respectively.

Regular season statistics

Appearances and goals

|}
Last updated: December 3, 2013
Source: Vancouver Whitecaps FC
Italic: denotes player is no longer with team

Goalkeeper stats
{| border="1" cellpadding="4" cellspacing="0" style="margin: 1em 1em 1em 1em 0; background: #f9f9f9; border: 1px #aaa solid; border-collapse: collapse; font-size: 95%; text-align: center;"
|-
| rowspan="2" style="width:15px; text-align:center;"|No.
| rowspan="2" style="width:15px; text-align:center;"|Nat.
| rowspan="2" style="width:160px; text-align:center;"|Player
| colspan="4" style="width:160px; text-align:center;"|Total
| colspan="4" style="width:160px; text-align:center;"|Major League Soccer
| colspan="4" style="width:160px; text-align:center;"|Canadian Championship
| colspan="4" style="width:160px; text-align:center;"|MLS Cup Playoffs
|-
|style="width: 40px;"|
|style="width: 40px;"|
|style="width: 40px;"|
|style="width: 40px;"|
|style="width: 40px;"|
|style="width: 40px;"|
|style="width: 40px;"|
|style="width: 40px;"|
|style="width: 40px;"|
|style="width: 40px;"|
|style="width: 40px;"|
|style="width: 40px;"|
|style="width: 40px;"|
|style="width: 40px;"|
|style="width: 40px;"|
|style="width: 40px;"|
|-
| style="text-align: right;" |18
|
| style="text-align: left;" |Brad Knighton
|1,350
|45
|19
|1.27
|990
|34
|15
|1.36
|360
|11
|4
|1.00
|0
|0
|0
|0
|-
| style="text-align: right;" |1
|
| style="text-align: left;" |Joe Cannon
|900
|38
|14
|1.40
|900
|38
|14
|1.40
|0
|0
|0
|0
|0
|0
|0
|0
|-
| style="text-align: right;" |22
|
| style="text-align: left;" |David Ousted
|360
|11
|4
|1.00
|360
|11
|4
|1.00
|0
|0
|0
|0
|0
|0
|0
|0
|-
| style="text-align: right;" |39
|
| style="text-align: left;" |Simon Thomas
|0
|0
|0
|0
|0
|0
|0
|0
|0
|0
|0
|0
|0
|0
|0
|0

Italic: denotes player is no longer with team

Top scorer
Includes all competitive matches. The list is sorted by shirt number when total goals are equal.

Top assists
Includes all competitive matches. The list is sorted by shirt number when total assists are equal.

Top minutes played
Includes all competitive matches. The list is sorted by shirt number when total minutes are equal.

Starting 11

Captains 
Includes all competitive matches. The list is sorted by shirt number when games are equal

{| class="wikitable" style="text-align:center"
|-
!  style="background:#5d9731; color:white; text-align:center; width:10%;"|No.
!  style="background:#5d9731; color:white; text-align:center; width:10%;"|Pos.
!  style="background:#5d9731; color:white; text-align:center; width:40%;"|Name
!  style="background:#5d9731; color:white; text-align:center; width:20%;"|Games
|-
|13
|MF
| Nigel Reo-Coker
| style="text-align:center;"|15
|-
|9
|FW
| Kenny Miller
| style="text-align:center;"|13
|-
|6
|DF
| Jay DeMerit
| style="text-align:center;"|1
|-
|12
|DF
| Lee Young-Pyo
| style="text-align:center;"|1

Injuries
Players in bold are still out from their injuries

Disciplinary record
Includes all competitive matches. The list is sorted by position, and then shirt number.

Italic: denotes no longer with club.

Recognition

MLS Team of the Week

MLS Player of the Week

MLS Player of the Month

MLS All-Stars 2013

MLS Reserves

West

Season games

Exhibition games

Reserves season stats

Updated as of August 1, 2013
Field players

Updated as of August 1, 2013
Goalkeepers

Player salaries

source:

U23/PDL Season
There are supporter groups for the 2013 PDL season in Vancouver, Seattle, Portland, Bremerton, and Victoria.  For information for things such as tailgating, away travel, and tifo see the associated forums, where they exist, for the Vancouver Southsiders, Emerald City Supporters (Seattle), Timbers Army (Portland), Kitsap Blue Guard, Kitsap Hellcats, and Lake Side Buoys (Victoria – Facebook).  The BC based supporters groups sponsor the Juan de Fuca Plate and the Washington State teams play for the Ruffneck Cup.

Results summary

Results

PDL squad stats

Squad stats

PDL regular season

PDL Playoffs

PDL roster

PDL season stats 

Updated as of July 17, 2013
Field players

Updated as of July 17, 2013
Goalkeepers

Players

 On loan

Juan de Fuca Plate

The Juan de Fuca Plate is a supporter-sponsored competition for British Columbian clubs in the United Soccer Leagues Premier Development League (USL PDL), a semi-professional league with clubs in Canada, the United States, and the Caribbean.

Founded in 2012 by supporters of the Vancouver Whitecaps and Victoria Highlanders, the Juan de Fuca Plate is meant to spur interest across British Columbia in soccer at the semi-professional level, and to inspire good-natured rivalry between the competing cities. Standings in regular season games between all USL PDL teams in British Columbia count towards the championship. Every year, the winner will receive the Juan de Fuca Plate.

For the 2013 USL PDL season, teams competing for the Juan de Fuca Plate will be the Victoria Highlanders and the Vancouver Whitecaps Residency U-23 team. The first game of the 2013 Juan de Fuca Plate will take place May 17, 2013 at UBC Thunderbird Stadium in Vancouver, British Columbia. The first Juan de Fuca Plate match was on May 13, 2012 at Royal Athletic Park in Victoria, British Columbia between the Whitecaps U-23s and the Highlanders. The Plate was first awarded July 11 at Swangard Stadium in Burnaby, British Columbia to the victorious team, the Vancouver Whitecaps FC U-23s

Past Champions:  2012– Vancouver Whitecaps FC U23  2013– Vancouver Whitecaps FC U23

Plate Games

Juan de Fuca Plate Scoring

Updated as of July 5, 2013
Field players

References 

Vancouver Whitecaps FC seasons
Vancouver Whitecaps FC
Van
Vancouver Whitecaps